State Highway 92 (SH 92) is a  long state highway that runs between the small Colorado communities of Hotchkiss and Sapinero. SH 92's western terminus is at US 50 (US 50) in Delta, and the eastern terminus is at US 50 near Sapinero.

Route description

From SH 92's western terminus at mile 70.919 on US 50 in Delta, it proceeds eastward towards Hotchkiss. In Hotchkiss, it has an intersection with SH 133, and then SH 92 turns to travel in a more southeastern direction. After some time it turns back to the east and enters the Curecanti National Recreation Area. It then crosses the Gunnison River at Blue Mesa Reservoir. Proceeding eastward SH 92 reaches its eastern terminus at mile 131.129 on US 50 in the town of Sapinero

History
The route was established in the 1920s and was paved by 1975.

Major intersections

References

External links

092
Colorado State Highway 092
Transportation in Delta County, Colorado
Transportation in Gunnison County, Colorado